Justicia chrysotrichoma is a plant native to the Cerrado vegetation of Brazil. It is one of about 420 species of flowering plants in the family Acanthaceae.

chrysotrichoma
Flora of Brazil